is a Japanese idol girl group. Their single "Be My☆Zombie" reached the sixth place on the weekly Oricon Singles Chart. The title song from their single "True End Player" was the ending song of the 2014 video game Hyperdimension Neptunia Re;Birth 3: V Century and the title song from their single "Ichizu Recipe" was the opening song of the 2015 anime television series Shomin Sample.

Discography

Albums

Singles

References

External links
 

Japanese girl groups
Japanese idol groups
Anime singers